The Los Angeles Theatre is a 2,000-seat historic movie palace at 615 S. Broadway in the historic Broadway Theater District in Downtown Los Angeles.

History
This Los Angeles Theatre was constructed in late 1930 and early 1931. It was commissioned by H.L. Gumbiner, an independent film exhibitor from Chicago, who also built the nearby Tower Theatre. Designed by S. Charles Lee, and Samuel Tilden Norton, the theater features a French Baroque interior. With its grand central staircase and gold brocade drapes, it has for many years been considered to be among the city's most lavish landmarks. The opulent interior is said to have been modeled after the Hall of Mirrors in Versailles. A crystal fountain stands at the top of the grand staircase, a restaurant and a ballroom were on the lower level.
The theatre was built in less than six months. In August 1930 there was only an excavated hole in the ground, and in January 1931 the theatre had its grand opening. Lee speeded construction by having the plaster ornamentation fabricated off-site and then brought to the building and fit together like a jigsaw puzzle. Most other theatres of the day had their decorative plaster molded and finished in place, with artisans working on scaffolding
 Charlie Chaplin helped fund the completion so that it would be ready to open with the premiere of his film City Lights in January 1931. It was the last such movie palace built on Broadway, as the area began to feel the effects of the Depression and faced competition from Hollywood Blvd. as the "Great White Way of the West". Attendance was strong through World War II, when many factory workers would see shows before and after their shifts. With the postwar suburbanization of Los Angeles, attendance declined throughout the later decades of the 20th century.

After closing its doors to the public in 1994, the Los Angeles has sat vacant for many years, although it can be rented as a venue for special events. The theater is listed on the National Register of Historic Places.

The Los Angeles is used most often today as a location for filming, and is frequently seen in commercials, television shows, and feature films. It has been featured in Funny Lady (1975); New York, New York (1977); Man on the Moon (1999); Charlie's Angels (2000) and its sequel, Charlie's Angels: Full Throttle (2003); The Lords of Salem (2012); the AMC series Mad Men; among many other films. The theatre was used in the back drop on the set of The Tonight Show with Jay Leno, and seen in the music video for "Safe and Sound" by Capital Cities" (2013), "Shake It" by Metro Station (2008), "Jaded" by Aerosmith (2000), "Moves Like Jagger" by Maroon 5 and Christina Aguilera (2011), "Delicate" by Taylor Swift (2018), "2U" by Kang Daniel (2020), "Black Swan" by BTS (2020), and Carrie Underwood's "Ghost Story" (2022). In 2004, the theatre housed the multi layered theatre production "Alma" (about Alma Mahler-Werfel) by Joshua Sobol, directed by Paulus Manker.

The theatre's façade and marquee design was used as the inspiration for that of the Hyperion Theater at Disney California Adventure in Anaheim.

See also
Million Dollar Theater
Orpheum Theatre (Los Angeles)
Tower Theatre
National Register of Historic Places listings in Los Angeles, California

References

External links

 Los Angeles Theatre website with extensive photo gallery

Cinemas and movie theaters in Los Angeles
Movie palaces
Buildings and structures in Downtown Los Angeles
Los Angeles Historic-Cultural Monuments
Historic district contributing properties in California
Buildings and structures on the National Register of Historic Places in Los Angeles
Theatres completed in 1931
Event venues established in 1931
1931 establishments in California
1930s architecture in the United States
Samuel Tilden Norton buildings
Italianate architecture in California
Beaux-Arts architecture in California
Baroque Revival architecture in the United States
Theatres on the National Register of Historic Places in California